San Francisco Plantation House is a historic plantation house in Reserve, St. John the Baptist Parish, Louisiana.  Built in 1853–1856, it is one of the most architecturally distinctive plantation houses in the American South.  It was declared a National Historic Landmark in 1974.  It is now a museum and event facility.

Description and history
The San Francisco Plantation House is located on the north bank of the Mississippi River, separated from the river by Louisiana Highway 44 and a levee. It is a -story structure, set on a full-height basement. Side-facing divided staircases lead to the main floor, which is sheltered on three sides by an ornate porch, supported by fluted columns with iron Corinthian capitals. It has deeply overhanging decorative cornice, which in profile gives the house a styling called "Steamboat Gothic". The house is topped by a dormered hip roof. The interior is also richly decorated, with paintings attributed to New Orleans artist Dominique Canova on ceiling and door panels.

The house is traditionally ascribed a construction date of 1853–1856, and may include elements of an older building.  It was built for Edmond Marmillion.
The unusual name “San Francisco” is believed to be derived from Edmond's oldest surviving son, Valsin's comment about the extraordinary debt he was confronted with when taking over the estate. He declared he was sans fruscins or “without a penny in my pocket.” The name evolved into St. Frusquin and, in 1879, was changed into “San Francisco” by the next owner, Achille D. Bougère.
The house has been restored to an 1850s appearance and is open for tours.  The on-grounds pavilion is also rented for special occasions.

See also
List of National Historic Landmarks in Louisiana
National Register of Historic Places listings in St. John the Baptist Parish, Louisiana
Frances Parkinson Keyes (1885–1970), author of a novel called Steamboat Gothic

References

External links

San Francisco Plantation – official site

National Historic Landmarks in Louisiana
Houses completed in 1849
Historic house museums in Louisiana
Plantation houses in Louisiana
Museums in St. John the Baptist Parish, Louisiana
Houses in St. John the Baptist Parish, Louisiana
1849 establishments in Louisiana
Houses on the National Register of Historic Places in Louisiana
National Register of Historic Places in St. John the Baptist Parish, Louisiana